Franklin Vinosis Webster (born August 7, 1978 in San Pedro Sula) is a Honduran football player.

Club career
He started his career playing forward for Victoria but moved abroad to play the rest of his career in El Salvador.

El Salvador
In summer 2002 he moved from Atlético Balboa to San Salvador, only to return to Atlético Balboa ahead of the 2004 Clausura season. He played the 2009 Apertura for Salvadoran giants FAS. Franklin Vinosis Webster also played for Alacranes Del Norte and return to Atlético Balboa in 2011.

In August 2010, he had to leave Vista Hermosa after only four matches due to financial difficulties. He then joined Guatemalan outfit Heredia.

References

External links
 El Grafico profile 

1978 births
Living people
People from San Pedro Sula
Association football forwards
Honduran footballers
C.D. Victoria players
Atlético Balboa footballers
C.D. Chalatenango footballers
San Salvador F.C. footballers
C.D. FAS footballers
Nejapa footballers
C.D. Vista Hermosa footballers
Liga Nacional de Fútbol Profesional de Honduras players
Honduran expatriate footballers
Expatriate footballers in El Salvador
Expatriate footballers in Guatemala